John Jorgensen is the name of:

 John Jørgensen, Danish speedway rider
 Spider Jorgensen (1919–2003), American baseball player, born John Donald Jorgensen
 Johnny Jorgensen (1921–1973), American basketball player

See also
 John Jorgenson (born 1956), American musician